The Emms Family Award is presented annually to the Rookie of the Year (top first-year player) in the Ontario Hockey League. The winner is also nominated for the CHL Rookie of the Year. The award was donated by Hap Emms. Leighton "Hap" Emms was a coach, owner, general manager and pioneer of the game, with a 33-year presence in the Ontario Hockey Association. His involvement in the Barrie Flyers, Niagara Falls Flyers, and St. Catharines Black Hawks, led to eight Memorial Cup tournament appearances, winning four times.

Winners 
List of winners of the Emms Family Award.
 Blue background denotes also named CHL Rookie of the Year

See also
 RDS Cup – Quebec Major Junior Hockey League Rookie of the Year
 Jim Piggott Memorial Trophy – Western Hockey League Rookie of the Year
 List of Canadian Hockey League awards

References

External links
 Ontario Hockey League

Ontario Hockey League trophies and awards
Rookie player awards
Awards established in 1973